Legacy is the fourth album by progressive metal group Shadow Gallery, released in 2001.

Track listing

Personnel
 Carl Cadden-James - Bass guitar, Vocals, Flute
 Brendt Allman - Acoustic, Electric guitars, Vocals, Keyboards
 Chris Ingles - Keyboards and Synthesizer
 Gary Wehrkamp - Piano, Guitars, Synthesizer, Vocals, Bass, Sound effects
 Joe Nevolo - Drums and percussion
 Mike Baker - Lead Vocals

References

Shadow Gallery albums
2001 albums